The 2007–08 Liga Leumit season began on 17 August 2007 and ended on 24 May 2008. Hakoah Amidar Ramat Gan won the title and were promoted to the Premier League alongside runners-up Hapoel Petah Tikva. Ironi Rishon LeZion and Hapoel Nazareth Illit were relegated to Liga Artzit

Final table

Results

First round

Second round

Third round

Top goalscorers

See also
List of Israeli football transfers 2007–08
2007–08 Toto Cup Leumit

Liga Leumit seasons
Israel
2007–08 in Israeli football leagues